Capitale & Victor ORLY is a French gallery established by the cultural association Capitale in Marseille, France, in 2005. The gallery presents works of international contemporary artists. The gallery is managed by Guennadi Grebniov.

Capitale & Victor ORLY gallery is located at 39 rue Paradis, a place which belongs to Marseille cultural heritage. One of the most old and well known in Provence Jouvène gallery presented artworks of Provençal painters during 150 years here. In 2015, Jouvène was replaced by the Capitale & Victor ORLY gallery.

Following the traditions of Jouvène, the Capitale & Victor ORLY gallery promotes the artworks of a new generation of Provençal painters and also presents international contemporary art.

1859 - 2015 cultural heritage 

An art gallery at 39 rue Paradis was established by Eugène Lambert in 1859. At the beginning of its work, the gallery focused on presenting the Provençal painters artworks, first of all a group of artists led by Émile Loubon (1809-1863), later called The School of Marseille: Auguste Auguier (1814-1865), Paul Guigou (1834-1871), Prosper Grésy (1801–1874), Adolphe Monticelli (1824-1886).

Along with the modern Provançal painters, the gallery exposed the works of the Barbizon school artists (Jean-Baptiste-Camille Corot (1796-1875), Eugène Boudin (1824-1898), Gustave Caillebotte (1848-1894)), as well as the masters of previous epochs, such as Michelangelo (1475-1564), Caravaggio (1571-1610), Murillo (1617-1682), and Jean-Honoré Fragonard (1732-1806).

After Eugène Lambert retired in 1923, his follower Alexandre Jouvène became the art gallery manager. In 1923 the gallery was officially named Jouvène. Among other great names exhibited in the gallery during the period of 1923 - 1946, were Paul Cézanne (1839-1906), Vincent van Gogh (1853-1890), Renoir (1841-1919) Félix Ziem (1821-1911), Jean-Baptiste Olive (1848-1936), François-Marius Granet (1775-1849), Théodore Rousseau (1812-1867), James Barry (1741-1806), Joseph Suchet (1824-1896), Joseph Garibaldi (1863-1941), Louis-Léopold Boilly (1761-1845), Jean Roque (1880-1925), Louis Gustav Ricard (1823-1873), Joseph Vernet (1714-1789), Joseph Boze (1746-1826), Vincent Courdouan (1810-1893), and Pierre Puget (1620-1694).

After 1946, with new managers, the Jouvène gallery continued the tradition of presenting the Provençal painters artworks. The gallery worked closely with the contemporary expressionists, such as: Georges Briata (1933-), Yvette Bonté (1925-), Raymond Garnier, François Guy (1940-), Jean-Paul Courchia (1955-).

During all times, the Jouvène gallery has been a place of meetings of painters, art collectors, art critics, and journalists.

The artists represented by the Capitale & Victor ORLY Gallery 

Sergiy Shapovalov, Andrey Lipatov, Mari Anna Wo Marr, Natalia Zaitceva, Pauline, Natalia Fedorova, Volodymyr Kirianov, Isabelle Geli, Pascale Bonnet, Taka, Zoya Skoropadenko, Odile Masselon, Daweis, Serge Moutalier, Gilbert Donadey, Victor Orly.

Contemporary art fairs participation 

The Capitale & Victor ORLY Gallery regularly participates in the international contemporary art fairs, such as:

 Grand Marche Art Contemporaine Paris
 Toronto Art Expo 
 Fine Art Ukraine 
 Beijing International Art Fair 
 Beijing International Art Exposition
 Shanghai Art Fair 
 Canton International Art Fair 
 Art Shenzhen
 Shenzhen International Art Fair
 China (Shenzhen) International  Cultural Industries Fair
 Guangzhou International Art Fair 
 Bridge of Friendship in Dubai
 Art Busan

References 

Art museums and galleries in France
Culture of Marseille